The Hornbein Couloir is a narrow and steep couloir high to the west on the north face of Mount Everest in Tibet, that extends from about  elevation,  below the summit.

For the first  vertical, the couloir inclines at about 47°, and the last  is narrower and steeper with about a 60° average incline. To the east on the north face with less angle is the much larger Norton Couloir.

Name 
The couloir was named after a member of the 1963 U.S.A. Everest Expedition, Thomas Hornbein, who was on the first ascent.

First ascent
The first ascent of the couloir was made on 22 May 1963, by Tom Hornbein and his partner, Willi Unsoeld, who were with the 1963 U.S.A. expedition attempting to reach the Everest summit from the Nepalese southern side by two routes. The majority of expedition members used the same route climbed ten years earlier by Tenzing Norgay and Edmund Hillary. This entailed negotiating the Western Cwm and the flank of Lhotse to the South Col, then up the southeast ridge to the peak.

Hornbein and Unsoeld, however, took a more challenging, different and unknown route up the west ridge from Camp 2 in the Western Cwm, traversing over the north face to ascend the steep and narrow couloir. After summiting, they descended the southeast ridge, bivouacking high up.

Subsequent ascents

Since the initial ascent, there have only been another nine summiters with five expeditions through the Hornbein Couloir, the last one in 1991.

10 May 1980: Japanese Tsuneoh Shigehiro and Takashi Ozaki made the first full ascent of the north face up the Japanese and Hornbein Couloirs from the Rongbuk Glacier in Tibet.

20 May 1986: Canadians Sharon Wood and Dwayne Congdon climbed a new west shoulder route from the Rongbuk Glacier and continued to the summit via the Hornbein Couloir. She became the first North American woman to summit Everest.

30 August 1986: Swiss Erhard Loretan and Jean Troillet, unprecedented and unrepeated, climbed the north face in a single alpine style push without oxygen, ropes, or tents in 37 hours, and glissaded down in under 5 hours. They climbed mostly at night and carried no backpacks above 8000m, a style that became known as "night naked". This is the first ascent outside of the month of May.

24 May 1989: Pole Andrzej Marciniak climbed the west ridge and the Hornbein Couloir.

20 May 1991: Swede Lars Cronlund climbed the Japanese and Hornbein Couloirs

Attempted snowboard descent 
In 2001, French snowboarder Marco Siffredi from Chamonix made the first snowboard descent of Everest by using the Norton Couloir. In 2002 he attempted a new descent via the Hornbein Couloir, but disappeared in the attempt; his body has never been found.

References

 Thomas Hornbein: Everest - The West Ridge. The Mountaineers Books, 1998, 9780898866162

See also
 EverestHistory.com

Himalayas
Mount Everest